Beragh (from Irish: Bearach, meaning "place of points/hills/standing stones") is a village and townland in County Tyrone, Northern Ireland. The 2001 Census recorded a population of 520.

History
One of the first known references to the village was on a 1690 Plantation map of Ireland. In the 1820s this village, the property of Earl Belmore, was described as having "one long wide street of very mean houses whose tenants for the most part appear to be poor". The inhabitants mostly worked in trade and agriculture. In 1841 the population was 617, the village having 103 houses. The village had a market patent granted under the name "Lowrystown".

The Portadown, Dungannon and Omagh Junction Railway opened Beragh railway station on 2 September 1861. The Ulster Transport Authority closed the station and the PD&O line on 15 February 1965.

Demography

19th century population
The population of the village decreased during the 19th century:

21st century population
Beragh is classified as a small village or hamlet by the NI Statistics and Research Agency (NISRA) (i.e. with a population between 500 and 1,000 people).
On Census day (29 April 2001) there were 520 people living in Beragh. Of these:
28.5% were aged under 16 years;
18.1% were aged 60 and over;
the average age was 34.3 years (NI average age 35.8 years);
47.5% of the population were male and 52.5% were female;
62.8% were from a Catholic Community Background;
35.4% were from a Protestant and Other Christian (including Christian related)' Community Background;
6.3% were born outside Northern Ireland; and
0.0% were from an ethnic group other than white.
For more details see: NI Neighbourhood Information Service

Sport
Beragh Red Knights is the local Gaelic football club.
Beragh Swifts F.C. is the local football club which plays in the Fermanagh & Western 1st Division; reserve team plays in the F&W 2nd Division.

Beragh Townland

The townland is situated in the historic barony of Omagh East and the civil parish of Clogherny and covers an area of 481 acres.

The population of the townland declined during the 19th century:

The village of Beragh is in the townland of the same name and in 1891 had an area of 17 acres.

See also
List of townlands of County Tyrone
List of archaeological sites in County Tyrone

References

External links

Villages in County Tyrone
Townlands of County Tyrone
Archaeological sites in County Tyrone
Barony of Omagh East